The Knysna–Amatole montane forests ecoregion, of the tropical and subtropical moist broadleaf forests biome, is in South Africa.

Setting
The ecoregion, which is South Africa's smallest in area, covers two separate enclaves.
 The Knysna forest extends along the coast between 22°E and 25°E, generally along 34°S in a region called the Garden Route. The KwaZulu-Cape coastal forest mosaic lies along the coast to the north-east.
 The Amatole forests lie in the Amatole mountains, which lie inland and 400 km ENE of the Knysna forest.

The ecoregion has a subtropical/warm-temperate climate  (Cfb in the Köppen climate classification). Rainfall occurs year-round, and ranges from 525 mm to 1,220 mm per year in the Knysna forest, and from 750 mm to 1,500 mm in the Amatole forests.

Flora
The trees are of tropical and afromontane origin, and include Ironwood (Olea capensis), Stinkwood (Ocotea bullata), Outeniqua Yellowwood (Afrocarpus falcatus), Real Yellowwood (Podocarpus latifolius), Cape Holly (Ilex mitis), White Pear (Apodytes dimidiata), Cape beech (Rapanea melanophloeos), Bastard Saffron (Cassine peragua), Cape Plane (Ochna arborea), assegai tree (Curtisia dentata), Kamassi (Gonioma kamassi), White Alder (Platylophus trifoliatus), and Red Alder (Cunonia capensis).

Fauna
The forests are home to the African elephant - in the last count (2017-2019) there was just one single adult female, age 45 years, surviving, - African leopard, bushbuck, blue duiker, bushpig and other mammals. The area has a rich assortment of birds including the near-endemic Knysna lourie (Tauraco corythaix), Knysna warbler (Bradypterus sylvaticus), Knysna woodpecker (Campethera notata), chorister robin-chat (Cossypha dichroa) and forest canary (Serinus scotops), while birds of prey found here include the crowned eagle (Stephanoaetus coronatus) and the African wood owl (Strix woodfordii). Reptiles include the endemic Knysna dwarf chameleon (Bradypodion damaranum).

Human use and conservation
Thomas Henry Duthie was the first appointed Supervisor of Crown Forests and Lands.  Despite the small size of the ecoregion, the Knysna and Amatole forests are South Africa's largest individual forests. The Knysna forest has been exploited for valuable timber since the 18th century, and the Amatole forests since the 20th century. Since 1939 the forests have mostly been within protected areas and are recovering well, although managed timber harvesting is allowed.

References

External links

Afromontane ecoregions
Afromontane forests
Afrotropical ecoregions
Rainforests of Africa
Tropical and subtropical moist broadleaf forests
Ecoregions of South Africa

Forests of South Africa
Geography of the Eastern Cape
Geography of the Western Cape